Jean Ampurias (10 December 1905 – 20 December 1974) was a French racing cyclist. He rode in the 1928 Tour de France.

References

1905 births
1974 deaths
French male cyclists